The incidence of life-threatening hypersensitivity reactions occurring during surgery and anesthesia is around one in 10,000 procedures. Serious allergic reactions to anesthetic medications are rare and a usually attributable to factors other than the anesthetic. Neuromuscular blocking agents, natural rubber latex, and antibiotics are the most common causes of serious allergic reactions during surgery. The mortality rate from these reactions ranges between 3-9%.

Successful immediate treatment requires prompt recognition by the attending anesthetist, or in the US, the attending anesthesiologist or nurse anesthetist. Anesthetists are trained to recognise if an allergic reaction is occurring. The identification of a complication is made by the recognition of issues such as low blood pressure, hives, wheezing, rash, swelling around the eyes or in the mouth and throat and other breathing difficulties. Adrenaline (epinephrine) remains the mainstay of treatment, with corticosteroids and antihistamines providing limited benefit in the acute situation.

Subsequent investigation aims to determine the responsible agent to allow its future avoidance. Skin testing is often useful to identify potentially cross-reactive compounds and appropriate therapeutic alternatives. This is done weeks after the initial reaction to allow the immune system to reset itself. However, skin testing can be misleading in giving false positive and false negative results.

Anaphylaxis during anesthesia 
Although complications during anesthesia are rare, potentially life-threatening consequences may occur if an anaphylactic reaction develops. The severity of the reaction whilst under anesthesia is because the anesthetist is only made aware of the allergy when it is severe enough to compromise the cardiovascular system and the respiratory system. At this stage, there is little time to manage the situation and recognise the severity of the condition.

The immediate management of the issue consists of three processes:
 The withdrawal of the substances
 Interrupting the effects of the preformed substances released in response to toxin presentation
 Prevention of further substance release
Since the full withdrawal of the offending substance is near impossible, the administration of adrenalin is the main treatment to counteract the effects. Once the patient is stable they will need close observation for 24 hours.

References

Anesthesia
Allergology